Kotlik Airport  is a state-owned public-use airport located one nautical mile (1.85 km) west of the central business district of Kotlik, a city in the Kusilvak Census Area of the U.S. state of Alaska.

As per Federal Aviation Administration records, this airport had 4,117 passenger boardings (enplanements) in calendar year 2007, an increase of 14% from the 3,654 enplanements in 2006.

Facilities 
It has one runway designated 2/20 with a 4,422 x 100 ft (1,348 x 30 m) gravel surface.

Airlines and destinations 

Prior to its bankruptcy and cessation of all operations, Ravn Alaska served the airport from multiple locations.

Top destinations

References

External links 
 FAA Alaska airport diagram (GIF)
 

Airports in the Kusilvak Census Area, Alaska